A flyback chronograph is a watch complication, in which the user can use the reset function without the need to first stop the chronograph. In regular chronographs, the user must stop, reset, and restart the chronograph in order to time an event after the chronograph has started.

Other names
The flyback function is also known by some other names:
 Retour-en-vol
 Taylor system 
 Permanent zero setting

Overview
The flyback function is a complication inspired by everyday life, as are some other complications: world time, universal time, power reserve.

Most flyback chronographs are constructed with the usual crown at 3 o'clock and 2 push-pieces at 2 and 4 o'clock. Usually the flyback function is controlled by the push-piece at 4 o'clock whereas the one at 2 o'clock is used to stop the chronograph.

Many chronographs are equipped with the flyback function, especially watches meant for pilots. It is much easier from the point of view of time saving, to instantly restart the chronograph with one push of the button, instead of three.

History
The appearance of the flyback function was catalyzed by the first watch with a separate chronograph button (the stop and reset functions were previously controlled by the winding-crown). This watch appeared in 1923 and was developed by Breitling.

Later, the chronographs gained their current form. In 1934 the Breitling chronographs received the second chronograph button with the function of returning the seconds hand to zero. Thus it became possible to measure short intervals of time using the add function. However the patent of the flyback chronograph belongs to Longines with its first flyback chronograph dating back to 1936.

See also
 Double chronograph

References

Watches
Clocks
Horology